Trémont may refer to the following places in France:

 Trémont, Maine-et-Loire, a commune in the Maine-et-Loire department
 Trémont, Orne, a commune in the Orne department
 Trémont-sur-Saulx, a commune in the Meuse département

See also 
 Tremont (disambiguation)